The Great Depression is the debut studio album by Canadian musical duo Common Grackle. It was released on Fake Four Inc. in 2010. It features guest appearances from Kool Keith and Ceschi.

Critical reception
Brett Uddenberg of URB gave the album 4 stars out of 5, saying, "The dense lyrics and smooth delivery of Pepper, avant-garde production of Factor and short-but-sweet guest shots from Ceschi all make for a wildly-entertaining and rewarding listen." Evan Sawdey of PopMatters called it "one of 2010's hidden musical gems."

Track listing

References

External links
 
 

2010 debut albums
Fake Four Inc. albums
Albums produced by Factor (producer)
Common Grackle (band) albums